Zveglevitsy is a rural locality (a village) in Nizhne-Vazhskoye Rural Settlement, Verkhovazhsky District, Vologda Oblast, Russia. The population was 15 as of 2002.

Geography 
Zveglevitsy is located 17 km east of Verkhovazhye (the district's administrative centre) by road. Voronovskaya is the nearest rural locality.

References 

Rural localities in Verkhovazhsky District